Milad Nouri Dijojin is an Iranian football midfielder who currently plays for the Iranian football club Saba Qom in the Iran Pro League.

References

Iranian footballers
Naft Tehran F.C. players
Saba players
1993 births
Living people
Association football midfielders